Fabe may refer to:

 Fabe (French rapper) (born 1971), a former member of Scred Connexion
 FABE, Fellow of the Association of Business Executives
 Dana Fabe (born 1951), American jurist
 Fabian "Fabe" McCarthy (born 1919), Australian rugby player

See also
Fab (disambiguation)